Paras Khadka (born 24 October 1987) is a Nepalese professional cricketer also known as the god of Nepali cricket. He was the captain of the Nepalese cricket team from 2008 to 2019. All-rounder Khadka is a right-handed batsman, a right-arm medium-fast bowler, and an off break bowler. He made his debut for Nepal against Malaysia in April 2004. He was one of the eleven cricketers to play in Nepal's first ever One Day International (ODI) match, against the Netherlands, in August 2018. On 3 August 2021, Khadka announced his retirement from international cricket. He was Nepal's All-time highest run scorer in both ODI and T20I format until his retirement.

Paras Khadka became the sixth Nepali cricketer to score an international century, when he hit an unbeaten 106 off 77 balls against Kuwait during the 2012 ACC Trophy Elite in October 2012. Under his captaincy, Nepal won the 2010 ICC World Cricket League Division Five in Nepal, 2012 ICC World Cricket League Division Four in Malaysia, 2012 ACC Trophy Elite in UAE, 2013 ICC World Cricket League Division Three in Bermuda, 2014 ICC World Cricket League Division Three in Malaysia, participated in the 2014 ICC World Twenty20 in Bangladesh and gained the Twenty20 International status.

On 28 January 2019, he became the first Nepalese batsman to score a century in an ODI match, doing so against the United Arab Emirates. On 28 September 2019, he became the first batsman for Nepal to score a century in a T20I match, doing so against Singapore.

Career

Early career
Born in Kathmandu, in 1987, Paras Khadka first represented Nepal at the Under-15 level when he played in the Under-15 Asia Cup in the United Arab Emirates in December 2002. He played for the Nepal Under-19s the following year, playing once against India Under-19s, and also in the 2003 Youth Asia Cup in Karachi.

In 2021, after playing in the ACC Under-17 Cup in India, he played in his first Under-19 World Cup, the 2004 ICC Under-19 Cricket World Cup in Bangladesh. He also made his debut for the senior side that year when he played against Malaysia in the 2004 ICC Intercontinental Cup, also his first-class debut.

Later in the year, he played in the 2004 ACC Trophy in Kuala Lumpur in addition to ACC Fast Track Countries Tournament matches against Singapore, the UAE and Hong Kong. In early 2005, he played in the Repêchage Tournament of the 2005 ICC Trophy,

After a match in the 2005 ICC Intercontinental Cup against Hong Kong, he returned to the Nepal Under-19 team for the 2005 ACC Under-19 Cup, held in Nepal. Nepal won the tournament after beating Malaysia in the final, thus qualifying for the 2006 ICC Under-19 Cricket World Cup in Sri Lanka the following February. Nepal won the plate tournament in the World Cup, beating Test-playing nations New Zealand and South Africa along the way.

Returning to the senior side, Khadka went on a tour of Pakistan before playing in the 2006 ACC Trophy in Kuala Lumpur. He also played all four ACC Premier League matches against Hong Kong, the UAE, Singapore and Malaysia that year. He played in the 2007 ACC Under-19 Cup in Kuala Lumpur, which Nepal again won after beating Afghanistan in the final. He also played in the 2007 ACC Twenty20 Cup in Kuwait, and captained Nepal in the 2008 ICC Under-19 Cricket World Cup in Malaysia, leading Nepal to the tenth-place finish.

2008-2015
Before the 2008 ICC Under-19 Cricket World Cup which he captained, he was quoted by the World Cup souvenir program as "arguably good enough to be in the line-up of any of the Test-playing countries".

He also successfully led the country to win the 2010 ICC World Cricket League Division Five.

In May 2012, he went to play for the Ontario Cricket Academy and Club in Canada with the efforts of his national team coach Pubudu Dassanayake for a short four-month spell. He rejoined the club for 2013 season as Vice-captain. In the 2012 ICC World Twenty20 Qualifier, he scored 254 runs in 8 innings at an average of 50.80.

In  2012, Nepal won the 2012 ACC Trophy Elite title in the UAE, where he scored a total of 291 runs at an average of 72.75 and picked up 9 wickets. He also scored his maiden century against Kuwait in the tournament. He was named the Player of the Tournament. Then he led Nepal to win the 2012 ICC World Cricket League Division Four in Malaysia.

He was also named the Player of the Tournament in the 2013 ACC Twenty20 Cup, where he scored a total of 207 runs with an average of 41.40. He led Nepal to win the 2013 ICC World Cricket League Division Three in Bermuda and got qualified for the 2014 Cricket World Cup Qualifier in New Zealand. 

He also successfully led his country to their first World Cup appearance in the 2014 ICC World Twenty20, after finishing third in the 2013 ICC World Twenty20 Qualifier in UAE just behind Ireland and Afghanistan.

In 2014 ICC World Twenty20 in Bangladesh, he scored 41 runs in both matches against Hong Kong and Bangladesh. He became the eighth player in T20I history to a take wicket with the first ball of his career. He set this record against Hong Kong when he took the wicket of Irfan Ahmed . ESPNcricinfo said that he is Nepal's Kapil Dev after he took two catches during the match against Afghanistan in the 2014 ICC World Twenty20, which helped Nepal seal the 9-run victory.

In the 2015 ICC World Cricket League Division Two, he scored 185 runs in 6 innings at an average of 30.83 and picked up 6 wickets at an average of 22.83 and an economy rate of 2.63. Nepal qualified for the 2015–17 ICC World Cricket League Championship but failed to secure promotion to Division One and qualification to 2015–17 ICC Intercontinental Cup. Earlier, he scored an unbeaten 123 off 114 balls in a practice match against Eastern Invitational XI, a cricket team of South Africa, when Nepal toured South Africa as a preparation for the tournament in January 2015.

In the World Cricket League, from 2008 Division Five to 2015 Division Two, he has scored 1157 runs in 46 innings at an average of 31.27, with seven fifties.

He was selected in Marylebone Cricket Club squad for the Emirates T20 tournament which was held in March 2015. He scored 137 runs in the T20i series against the Netherlands at an average of 45.66.

2018 onwards
In the January 2018, he was named captain in Nepal's squad for the 2018 ICC World Cricket League Division Two tournament. In the first match against the host Namibia national cricket team Nepal won the toss and elected to field first. Paras bowled 4 overs with his figures of 1/16. In a chase of 139, Paras scored 19 of 35 balls. Nepal won the match by 1 wicket with 4 balls remaining. The second match was with Oman national cricket team. Paras Khadka scored 17 of 42 balls as Nepal got all out in 138 runs in 46th over. Khadka bowled his spell of 0/16 in 3 overs in the match. Oman won the match by 6 wickets. With one win and one loss in the tournament, the next game with UAE was crucial for Nepal. In the third match against UAE, he scored 51 runs hitting five sixes and two fours which was crucial enough to be adjudged man of the match. With that win, Nepal had 4 points in 3 matches and was standing in the second place behind Canada. In the fourth match against Kenya, he scored crucial 42 runs off 44 balls with 3 fours and 2 sixes in a low scoring contest which turned victory for Nepal. In the fifth and final match of the ICC World Cricket League Division Two, he bowled his 7 overs spell of 0/16 in the game and got out in the very first ball.

In the final match of 2018 ICC World Cricket League Division Two against UAE, he scored 112 * runs off 103 balls with 8 sixes and 3 fours in a losing cause. In reply of UAE's 277 runs, Nepal scored 270/8 in stipulated 50 overs losing by 7 runs. Paras scored his century in the final over and lost the match despite hitting 3 sixes in the final over. He remained unbeaten scoring his 2nd List A century while none of his teammate scored a fifty. On return to Nepal, he praised the performances of Sandeep Lamichhane and Karan KC in the last league match against Canada. He praised his teammates as:  Prime Minister KP Sharma Oli felicitated him along with other cricketers for their performances in 2018 ICC World Cricket League Division Two.

In July 2018, he was named as the captain of Nepal's squad for their One Day International (ODI) series against the Netherlands. These were Nepal's first ODI matches since gaining ODI status during the 2018 Cricket World Cup Qualifier. He made his ODI debut for Nepal against the Netherlands on 1 August 2018.

In August 2018, he was named the captain of Nepal's squad for the 2018 Asia Cup Qualifier tournament. In October 2018, he was named the captain of Nepal's squad in the Eastern sub-region group for the 2018–19 ICC World Twenty20 Asia Qualifier tournament.

In the third match of Nepal's tour of the United Arab Emirates, Paras became first Nepalese batsman to score an ODI century at Dubai. He was adjudged the Man of the Match where he scored 115 runs off 109 balls.

In June 2019, he was named as the captain of Nepal's squad for the Regional Finals of the 2018–19 ICC T20 World Cup Asia Qualifier tournament. In September 2019, he scored his first T20I century and became the first and only captain in men's T20I cricket to score a century as a captain when chasing.

On 15 October 2019, Khadka resigned as captain of the Nepalese national cricket team. He explained that he wanted a new way of taking things forward with a fresh start and committed vision, with everyone involved, following the reinstatement of the Cricket Association of Nepal.

Soon after his resignation from captaincy, Khadka was signed by Team Abu Dhabi for the 2019 T10 League. With this signing, Khadka became the 3rd Nepalese cricketer to play in a foreign franchise league, after Sandeep Lamichhane and Sompal Kami. Khadka said "It is an honour to play in this incredibly exciting tournament. I know the matches are going to be intense, but I love playing against the world's best. I'm hoping to see the Nepalese flag flying high in the stands of Zayed Cricket Stadium when I play next month." Khadka replaced Pakistani left-arm pacer Mohammad Amir, after he and other Pakistani players were ruled ineligible for the tournament by the PCB. Trevor Bayliss, head coach of Team Abu Dhabi, referred to him as an impressive player who excelled in short forms of the game, and both his batting and bowling prowess made him a threat to the opposition.

In November 2019, he was also named in Nepal's squad for the cricket tournament at the 2019 South Asian Games. The Nepal team won the bronze medal, after they beat the Maldives by five wickets in the third-place playoff match. In September 2020, he was one of eighteen cricketers to be awarded with a central contract by the Cricket Association of Nepal.

In November 2020, Khadka was nominated for the ICC Men's Associate Cricketer of the Decade award.

On 3 August 2021, Khadka announced retirement from international cricket.

Post-Retirement 
Post-retirement Paras Khadka has established his own cricket academy named Cricket Excellence Center working for the grassroots cricket development in Nepal. The academy is located at Baluwatar, Kathmandu which has a world-class cricketing facilities to ensure the growth of aspiring cricketers in Nepal.

2010 boycott 

In May 2010, 18 members of the national cricket team, led by Khadka, held a press conference and said they will not play the national league because of the behavior of Cricket Association of Nepal (CAN). He led the boycott of national league for the second time in April 2014 demanding the restructuring of Cricket Association of Nepal and better facilities for players. This resulted in CAN being drawn into controversy of financial mismanagement.

Awards
 NSFJ Pulsar Player of the Year 2016 AD
 NSFJ Pulsar Player of the Year 2017 AD
NNIPA Best cricketer of the Year 2017
 NSFJ Pulsar Player of the Year 2017 AD 
 ICC Men's Associate Player of the Decade Nominee
 NSJF Pulsar Player of the decade 2022 AD

Personal life
He married his longtime girlfriend Prapti Rajyalaxmi Rana on 26 February 2015.

References

External links 

 
Paras Khadka at CricNepal

1987 births
Living people
Sportspeople from Kathmandu
Nepalese cricketers
Nepalese cricket captains
Nepal One Day International cricketers
Nepal Twenty20 International cricketers
Cricketers at the 2010 Asian Games
Cricketers at the 2014 Asian Games
Asian Games competitors for Nepal
South Asian Games bronze medalists for Nepal
South Asian Games medalists in cricket